Computed axial lithography is a method for 3D printing based on computerised tomography scans to create objects from photo-curable resin. The process was developed by a collaboration between the University of California, Berkeley and the Lawrence Livermore National Laboratory. Unlike other methods of 3D printing, computed axial lithography does not build models through depositing layers of material, as fused deposition modelling and stereolithography does, instead it creates objects using a series of 2D images projected onto a cylinder of resin. It is notable for its ability to build object much more quickly than other methods using resins and the ability to embed objects within the objects.

References 

3D printing processes